The Storm is a 1930 American pre-Code adventure film directed by William Wyler, written by John Huston, Charles Logue, Tom Reed and Wells Root, and starring Lupe Vélez, Paul Cavanagh, William "Stage" Boyd, Alphonse Ethier and Ernie Adams. It was released on August 22, 1930, by Universal Pictures.

Cast 
Lupe Vélez as Manette Fachard
Paul Cavanagh as Dave Stewart
William "Stage" Boyd as Burr Winton 
Alphonse Ethier as Jacques Fachard
Ernie Adams as Johnny Behind the 8-Ball

Preservation Status 
The Library of Congress are in possession of a print.

References

External links 
 

1930 films
American adventure films
1930 adventure films
Universal Pictures films
Films directed by William Wyler
American black-and-white films
1930s English-language films
1930s American films
English-language adventure films